
Year 416 BC was a year of the pre-Julian Roman calendar. At the time, it was known as the Year of the Tribunate of Atratinus, Ambustus, Mugillanus and Rutilus (or, less frequently, year 338 Ab urbe condita). The denomination 416 BC for this year has been used since the early medieval period, when the Anno Domini calendar era became the prevalent method in Europe for naming years.

Events 
 By place 
 Greece 
 With the encouragement of Alcibiades, the Athenians take the island of Melos (which has remained neutral during the Peloponnesian War). Its inhabitants are treated with great cruelty by the Athenians, with all the men capable of bearing arms being killed, while the women and children are made slaves.
 In Sicily, the Ionian city of Segesta asks for Athenian help from the Dorian city of Selinus (which is supported by the powerful Sicilian city of Syracuse). The people of Syracuse are ethnically Dorian (as are the Spartans), while the Athenians, and their allies in Sicily, are Ionian. The Athenians feel obliged to assist their ally and therefore prepare an armada to attack Sicily.

 By topic 
 Drama 
 The tragedian Agathon wins first prize at the Lenaia.
 Agathon along with Alcibiades and Socrates and Aristophanes and others attend a symposium described by Plato.

Births

Deaths

References